Marcelo José Palau Balzaretti (born 1 August 1985) is an Uruguayan football midfielder who is currently playing for Cerro Porteño in the Paraguayan Primera División.

External links
 Marcelo Jose Palau at BDFA 
 
 Marcelo Palau Balzaretti at ESPN Deportes 
 

1985 births
Living people
Footballers from Montevideo
Uruguayan footballers
Uruguayan expatriate footballers
Association football midfielders
Atenas de San Carlos players
Rampla Juniors players
S.D. Quito footballers
Montevideo Wanderers F.C. players
Club Puebla players
Club Nacional de Football players
Cruz Azul footballers
Clube Atlético Linense players
Club Guaraní players
Club Athletico Paranaense players
Uruguayan Primera División players
Liga MX players
Ecuadorian Serie A players
Paraguayan Primera División players
Campeonato Brasileiro Série A players
Expatriate footballers in Mexico
Expatriate footballers in Ecuador
Expatriate footballers in Paraguay
Expatriate footballers in Brazil
Cerro Porteño players